Santo Taumata (born 5 February 2003) is a New Zealand rugby union player. She plays for the Black Ferns internationally and was a member of their 2021 Rugby World Cup champion squad. She also plays for the Chiefs Manawa in the Super Rugby Aupiki competition and for Bay of Plenty provincially.

Rugby career

2022 
Taumata was selected for the Chiefs Manawa squad for the inaugural 2022 Super Rugby Aupiki season. She was awarded the Emerging Player of the Year for her efforts in the 2022 Farah Palmer Cup season and was also Female Club Player of the Year at the 2022 Zespri Bay of Plenty Rugby Awards.

Taumata was named in the Black Ferns squad for the Laurie O’Reilly Cup Test series against Australia. She made her international debut on 27 August 2022 in Adelaide. She was later selected for the 2021 Rugby World Cup 32-player squad.

2023 
In 2023, She re-signed with the Chiefs Manawa for a second year.

References 

2003 births
Living people
New Zealand female rugby union players